Arthur Carroll (6 June 1893 – 22 July 1959) was an Irish Gaelic footballer. His championship career at senior level with the Tipperary county team spanned nine years from 1917 to 1926.

Carroll made his debut on the inter-county scene at the age of twenty-four when he was selected for the Tipperary senior team. He made his debut during the 1917 championship. The highlight of his inter-county career came in 1920 when he won an All-Ireland medal. Carroll also won three Munster medals.

Honours
Templemore-Castleiney
Tipperary Senior Football Championship (1): 1925, 1936

Tipperary
All-Ireland Senior Football Championship (1): 1920
Munster Senior Football Championship (3): 1918, 1920, 1922,

References

1893 births
1959 deaths
Irish farmers
Tipperary inter-county Gaelic footballers
Winners of one All-Ireland medal (Gaelic football)